Wagons are an Australian alt-country band from Melbourne, Australia, led by singer/songwriter/television and radio presenter Henry Wagons.

History
The band was formed in Melbourne in 1999 by Henry Wagons with his school friends from Glen Waverley in Melbourne; Si "The Philanthropist" Francis, Richard Blazé, Steve "Harmony" Hassett and Mark "Tuckerbag" Dawson.

The band has cited influences including Johnny Cash, Scott Walker, Nick Cave and Vegas-era Elvis on their musical style.  A regular feature of their live shows is a version of the Wayfaring Strangers song "Willie Nelson". They are known for their energetic and dramatic indie country rock performances in which Henry Wagons engages in banter with the audience  between songs.

Henry Wagons is the grandson of Henry Krips, a Viennese emigree conductor of the South Australian Symphony Orchestra. He was named one of the 100 most influential people in Melbourne by the AGE magazine in 2009. Prior to forming the band, Henry (as Henry Krips), was synthesizer player in a Melbourne improvisational quartet called Dworzec.

Wagons released their first album in 2000. On 11 March 2002 they released their second album Trying To Get Home on Chapter Music.

On 26 July 2004, they released Draw Blood on Spunk Records. The Curse of Lightning was released on 15 October 2007 on Spunk Records.

The Rise and Fall of Goodtown was released on 21 April 2009 on Spunk Records. The album was produced by Cornel Wilczek. In 2009 they won The Age EG Best Band and Best Album awards.

Rumble Shake and Tumble was released on 16 August 2011 on Spunk Records, and was again produced by Cornel Wilczek. Wagons toured in the US and Canada appearing at the Bumbershoot festival in Seattle in September 2011. They won The Age EG awards for Best Band, and the Best Album award for Rumble Shake and Tumble. The album also won the Best Independent Country Album award in the Jägermeister Independent Music Awards 2011.

Wagons performed in the US and appeared at SXSW in March 2011.

Acid Rain and Sugar Cane was released on 16 May 2014 on Spunk Records.  The album was produced by Mick Harvey of the Bad Seeds, who also played on the album. Wagons again toured North America in 2014 appearing at festivals including the Vancouver Folk Festival, Montreal Jazz Festival, and RBC Ottawa Bluesfest.

Wagons have toured extensively in Australia as well as in New Zealand, the US and Canada, appearing at music festivals including SXSW, Bumbershoot, Montreal Jazz Festival, Bluesfest, Big Day Out and Laneway.

Members

Current
 Henry Wagons (Henry Krips) – vocals, guitar, keyboard
 Mark "Tuckerbag" Dawson – drums, bass guitar
 Si "Philanthropist" Francis – drums, Bass guitar
 Richard Blazé – guitar
 John Guscott – guitar
 Matthew "Softmoods" Hassett – keyboards, backing vocals

Former members
 Chad Mason
 Steve "Harmony" Hassett
 Chris Altmann

Awards and nominations

AIR Awards
The Australian Independent Record Awards (commonly known informally as AIR Awards) is an annual awards night to recognise, promote and celebrate the success of Australia's Independent Music sector.

|-
| rowspan="2" | AIR Awards of 2011
|Rumble Shake and Tumble 
| Best Independent Country Album
| 
|-

EG Awards/Music Victoria Awards
The Music Victoria Awards (previously known as The Age EG Awards and The Age Music Victoria Awards) are an annual awards night celebrating Victorian music.

|-
| rowspan="2"| EG Awards of 2009
| themselves 
| Best Band
| 
|-
| The Rise and Fall of Goodtown
| Best Album
| 
|-
| rowspan="2"| EG Awards of 2011
| themselves 
| Best Band
| 
|-
| Rumble Shake and Tumble
| Best Album
| 
|-
| rowspan="2"| Music Victoria Awards of 2014
| themselves 
| Best Band
| 
|-
| Acid Rain & Sugar Cane
| Best Country Album
| 
|-

Discography

Albums

References

External links
 

Australian indie rock groups
Musical groups established in 1999
Musical groups from Melbourne
1999 establishments in Australia